Diaa is an Egyptian male given name.

Notable people with this name include:
 Ahmed Diaa Eddine (1912–1976), Egyptian film director
 Diaa al-Din Dawoud (1926–2011), Egyptian politician
 Diaa Raofat (born 1988), Egyptian footballer
 Diaa Rashwan (born 1960), Egyptian journalist
 Karim Diaa Eddine, Egyptian director

See also
 DIAA, Delaware Interscholastic Athletic Association
 Diya (disambiguation)